Assuania is a genus of frit flies in the family Chloropidae. There are about six described species in Assuania.

Species
Assuania glabricollis Becker, 1910
Assuania nigricollis (Becker, 1913)
Assuania scutellaris (Adams, 1905)
Assuania sudanensis Becker, 1922
Assuania sulcifrons Bezzi, 1908
Assuania thalhammeri (Strobl, 1893)

References

Chloropidae genera
Taxa named by Theodor Becker
Chloropidae